is a former Japanese football player. She played for the Japan national team.

Club career
Kaihori was born in Nagaokakyo on September 4, 1986. In 2004, she was a high school student and joined the youth team for the Speranza FC Takatsuki. She moved to INAC Leonessa (later INAC Kobe Leonessa) in 2008. The club won the L.League championship three years in a row (2011-2013). She was also selected one of the Best Eleven twice, in 2011 and 2013. She retired in 2015.

National team career
In May 2008, Kaihori was selected by the Japan national team for the 2008 AFC Women's Asian Cup. At this competition, on May 31, she debuted against Chinese Taipei. She was Japan's goalkeeper in the 2011 World Cup final, where she saved two penalties from Shannon Boxx and Tobin Heath in the shoot-out. Japan defeated the United States, 3–1. She was part of the Japanese team that won the silver medal at the 2012 Summer Olympics, playing in one game, vs South Africa, which saw Kaihori keep a clean sheet. She also played five matches at the 2015 World Cup and Japan finished in second place. She played 53 games for Japan until 2015.

National team statistics

References

External links

Japan Football Association

1986 births
Living people
Association football people from Kyoto Prefecture
Japanese women's footballers
Japan women's international footballers
Nadeshiko League players
Speranza Osaka-Takatsuki players
INAC Kobe Leonessa players
Olympic footballers of Japan
Olympic silver medalists for Japan
Olympic medalists in football
Medalists at the 2012 Summer Olympics
Footballers at the 2008 Summer Olympics
Footballers at the 2012 Summer Olympics
FIFA Women's World Cup-winning players
2011 FIFA Women's World Cup players
2015 FIFA Women's World Cup players
Asian Games medalists in football
Asian Games gold medalists for Japan
Asian Games silver medalists for Japan
Medalists at the 2010 Asian Games
Medalists at the 2014 Asian Games
Footballers at the 2010 Asian Games
Footballers at the 2014 Asian Games
Women's association football goalkeepers